Activities of daily living (ADLs or ADL) is a term used in healthcare to refer to people's daily self-care activities. Health professionals often use a person's ability or inability to perform ADLs as a measurement of their functional status. The concept of ADLs was originally proposed in the 1950s by Sidney Katz and his team at the Benjamin Rose Hospital in Cleveland, Ohio. The concept of ADLs has been added to and refined by a variety of researchers since that time. For example, many indexes that assess ADLs now include some measure of mobility. Additionally, to be more inclusive of the range of activities that support independent living, in 1969, Lawton and Brody developed the instrumental activities of daily living (IADLs). ADLs are often used in the care of people with disabilities, people with injuries, and elderly people. Younger children often require help from adults to perform ADLs, as they have not yet developed the skills necessary to perform them independently.

Common ADLs include feeding oneself, bathing, dressing, grooming, work, homemaking, cleaning oneself after urinating and defecating, and leisure. A number of national surveys have collected data on the ADL status of the U.S. population. While basic definitions of ADLs have been suggested, what specifically constitutes a particular ADL for each individual may vary. Some factors that influence peoples' perception of their function level include culture and education.

ADLs are categorized into basic, self-care tasks acquired starting from infancy, and instrumental, tasks learned throughout adolescence. A person who cannot perform essential ADLs may have poorer quality of life or be unsafe in their current living conditions; therefore, they may require the help of other individuals and/or mechanical devices. Examples of mechanical devices to aid in ADLs include electric lifting seats, bathtub transfer benches, and ramps to replace stairs.

Basic 
Basic ADLs consist of self-care tasks that include:

 Bathing and showering
 Personal hygiene and grooming (including brushing/combing/styling hair)
 Dressing
 Toilet hygiene (getting to the toilet, cleaning oneself, and getting back up)
 Functional mobility, often referred to as "transferring", as measured by the ability to walk, get in and out of bed, and get into and out of a chair; the broader definition (moving from one place to another while performing activities) is useful for people with different physical abilities who are still able to get around independently
 Self-feeding (not including cooking or chewing and swallowing), as opposed to assisted feeding

The functional independence measure (FIM) is a tool developed in 1983 that uses a 0-7 scale to rank different ADLs based on the level of assistance they require. A 7 on the scale means the patient is independent, whereas a 0 on the scale means the patient cannot complete the activity without assistance. The specific breakdown of the scale is shown below:

7 - Independent

6 - Modified Independent

5 - Supervision/Set-up

4 - Minimal Assist

3 - Moderate Assist

2 - Maximal Assist

1 - Total Assist

0 - Activity Does Not Occur

Although not in wide general use, a mnemonic that some find useful for identifying different ADLs is DEATH: dressing/bathing, eating, ambulating (walking), toileting, hygiene.

Instrumental 
Instrumental activities of daily living (IADLs) are not necessary for fundamental functioning, but they let an individual live independently in a community:
 Cleaning and maintaining the house
 Managing money
 Moving within the community
 Preparing meals
 Shopping for groceries and necessities
 Taking prescribed medications
 Using the telephone or other form of communication

Occupational therapists often evaluate IADLs when completing patient assessments.  The American Occupational Therapy Association identifies 12 types of IADLs that may be performed as a co-occupation with others:
 Care of others (including selecting and supervising caregivers)
 Care of pets
 Child rearing
 Communication management
 Community mobility
 Financial management
 Health management and maintenance
 Home establishment and maintenance
 Meal preparation and cleanup
 Religious observances
 Safety procedures and emergency responses
 Shopping

Therapy 
Occupational therapists evaluate and use therapeutic interventions to rebuild the skills required to maintain, regain or increase a person's independence in all Activities of Daily Living that have declined because of health conditions (physical or mental), injury or age-related debility.

Physical therapists use exercises to assist patients in maintaining and gaining independence in ADLs. The exercise program is based on what components patients are lacking such as walking speed, strength, balance, and coordination. Slow walking speed is associated with increased risk of falls. Exercise enhances walking speed, allowing for safer and more functional ambulation capabilities. After initiating an exercise program, it is important to maintain the routine.  Otherwise, the benefits will be lost. Exercise for patients who are frail is essential for preserving functional independence and avoiding the necessity for care from others or placement in a long-term-care facility.

Assistance 

Assisting in activities of daily living are skills required in nursing and as well as other professions such as nursing assistants. This includes assisting in patient mobility, such as moving an activity intolerant patient within bed. For hygiene, this often involves bed baths and assisting with urinary and bowel elimination.

Evaluation 
There are several evaluation tools, such as the Katz ADL scale, the Older Americans Resources and Services (OARS) ADL/IADL scale, the Lawton IADL scale and the Bristol Activities of Daily Living Scale.

In the domain of disability, measures have been developed to capture functional recovery in performing basic activities of daily living. Among them, some measures like the Functional Independence Measure are designed for assessment across a wide range of disabilities. Others like the Spinal Cord Independence Measure are designed to evaluate participants in a specific type of disability.

Most models of health care service use ADL evaluations in their practice, including the medical (or institutional) models, such as the Roper–Logan–Tierney model of nursing, and the resident-centered models, such as the Program of All-Inclusive Care for the Elderly (PACE).

The Pervasive computing technology was considered to determine the wellness of the elderly living independently in their homes. The framework of the intelligent system consists of monitoring important daily activities through the observation of everyday object usage. The improved wellness indices helped in reducing false warnings related to the daily activities of elderly living.

Research 
ADL evaluations are used increasingly in epidemiological studies as an assessment of health in later-life that does not necessarily involve specific ailments. Studies using ADL differ from those investigating specific disease outcomes, as they are sensitive to a broader spectrum of health effects, at lower-levels of impact. ADL is measured on a continuous scale, making the process of investigation fairly straightforward.

Sidney Katz initially studied 64 hip fracture patients over an 18-month period. Comprehensive data on treatments, patient progression, and outcomes were collected during this study. After analyzing the study data, the researchers discovered that the patients they viewed as being most independent could perform a set of basic activities – ranging from the most complex bathing activity, to the least complex feeding activity. From these data, Katz developed a scale to assess patients' ability to live independently. This was first published in the 1963 in the Journal of the American Medical Association; the paper has since been cited over 1,000 times.

Although the scale offers a standardized measure for psychological and biological function, the process of arriving at this assumption has been criticised. Specifically, Porter has argued for a phenomenological approach noting that:

Porter emphasizes the possible disease-specific nature of ADLs (being derived from hip-fracture patients), the need for objective definition of ADLs, and the possible value of adding additional functional measures.

A systematic review examined the effectiveness of imparting activities of daily life skills programmes, specifically for people with schizophrenia:

See also 

 Activities of daily living assistance
 Assisted living
Schwab and England ADL scale
 Care of residents
 Global Assessment of Functioning
 Long-term care
 Long term care insurance
 Nursing home
 Transgenerational design

References 

Occupational therapy
Nursing
Caregiving
Self-care